Paget is a rural community in Ontario. It is unincorporated, and is situated to the east of Lovering Lake.

References

Communities in Sudbury District